The Hotel Gran Meliá Don Pepe is a luxury 5-star hotel in Marbella, Spain.  Its three restaurants serve Spanish cuisine; chef Dani García has received some international recognition. In 1974 the hotel was described as having a "private beach" and "elegant decor".

See also
List of hotels in Spain

References

External links
Official site

Hotels in Marbella
Hotel buildings completed in 1964